= Shtrimer Pharmacy =

Building constructed to be a pharmacy shop in the 19th century

- Аптека Штримера (Russian)
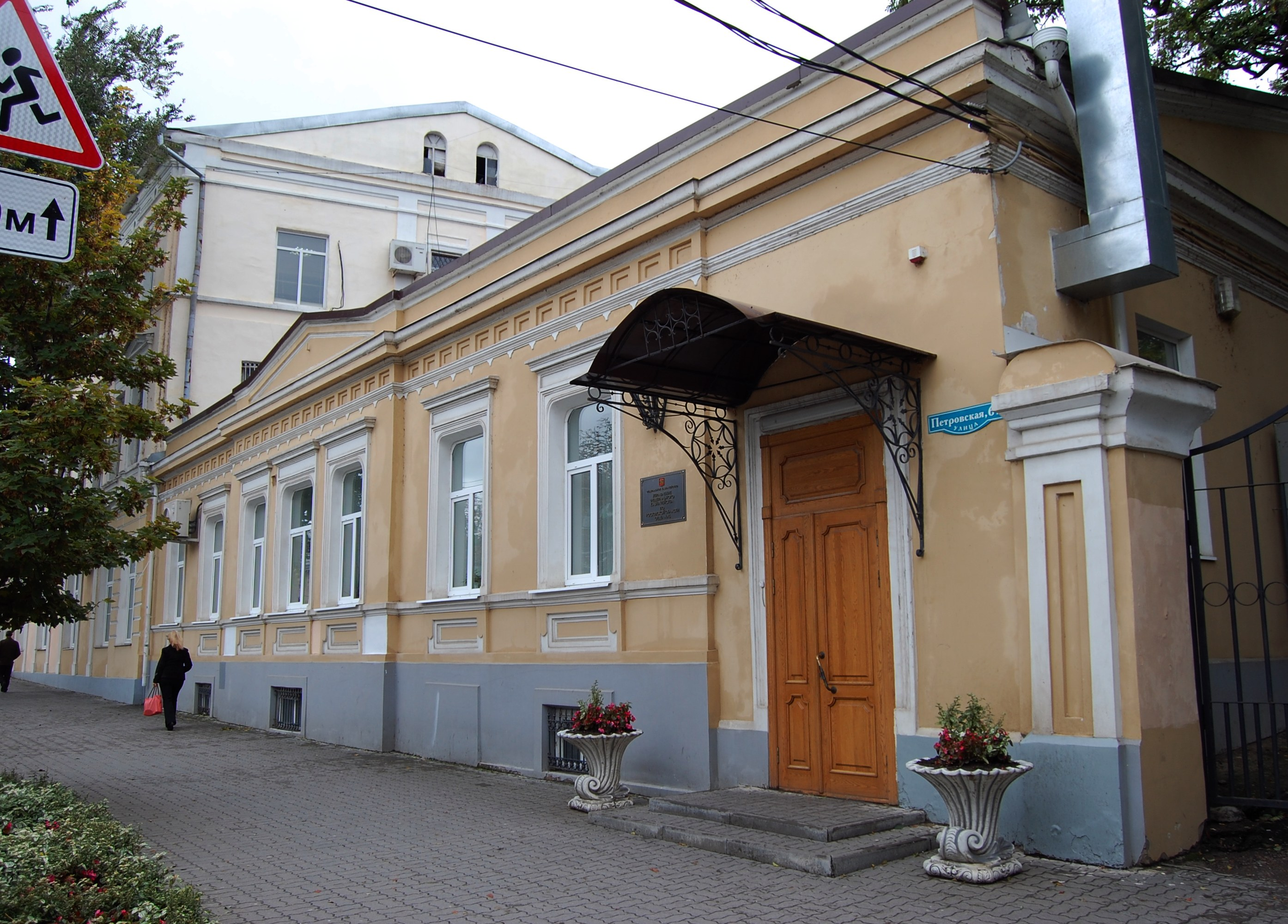

- Location within Russia
- Location: Petrovskaya Street, 61, Taganrog, Rostov oblast, Russia

History
- Built: 1871

Site notes
- Owner: Moses Shtrimer

Shtrimer Pharmacy (Russian: Аптека Штримера) is an old mansion in Taganrog (Petrovskaya Street, 61, at the time of construction in 1871 - Petrovskaya St., 33).

== History ==
The brick one-story building was built according to the drawings of 1871 for the pharmacist Moses (Mikhail) Osipovich Shtrimer. In the 1870s from his cellars was allowed the sale of bottles of Caucasian mineral waters.

After the death of Shtrimer in February 1880 at the age of 44 years, the estate was taken over by his wife Nadezhda Davydovna Shtrimer. She lived with her children Alexander (1866) and Pelene (1869) until 1925 year. The pharmacy shop continued to operate. Extremely rare case for Taganrog when from the date of construction in 1872 until municipalization in 1925, the house belonged to one family.

In 1912 in the building was the "Great Petrovsky Pharmacy N. Shtrimer", in which a pharmacist M. A. Varinberg worked as a tenant. The pharmacy offered proprietary products and items for the care of patients, as well as natural mineral waters.

In 1912 in the basement was a barbecue "Ararat".

In the days of the German occupation (1941-1943) there was a registry office in which by order of the German authorities, was prescribed obligatory registration of all citizens before Church ceremonies of baptism, marriage and burial.

Today, in the building is located department № 15 of the Office of the Federal Treasury across the Rostov region.

== Architectural features ==
Shtrimera's one-and-a-half-story mansion stands out from the urban environment using Baroque Revival architecture.

== Famous inhabitants ==
Parnokh Yakov Solomonovich (1847-1912) - pharmacist, pharmacy owner, member of Taganrog city duma, honorary citizen of Taganrog.
